

Mässersee is the smallest of four mountain lakes in the upper Binntal (Binn valley) of the canton of Valais, Switzerland.

Lakes of Valais